The London Film Critics' Circle Award for Screenwriter of the Year in an annual award given by the London Film Critics' Circle.

List of winners

Multiple winners
The following screenwriters have won multiple awards:

 3 wins – Joel Coen and Ethan Coen (1996, 2001, 2013)
 2 wins – Alan Bennett (1985, 1987)
 2 wins – Woody Allen (1986, 1990)
 2 wins – David Mamet (1988, 1991)
 2 wins – Charlie Kaufman (2000, 2004)
 2 wins - Martin McDonagh (2017, 2022)

Screenwriting awards for film
Screenwriter